Carbon Shift: How Peak Oil and the Climate Crisis Will Change Canada (and Our Lives) is a 2009 non-fiction book edited by Thomas Homer-Dixon and Nick Garrison that collects six essays that discusses the issues of peak oil and climate change.  The book was first published in hardcover by Random House of Canada in 2009 under the title Carbon Shift: How the Twin Crises of Oil Depletion and Climate Change Will Define the Future, and became a national bestseller.  In 2010, the paperback was published by Vintage Canada, a division of Random House Canada, the sub-title then changing to How Peak Oil and the Climate Crisis Will Change Canada (and Our Lives).

Synopsis
Carbon Shift encompasses six essays by experts in the fields of economics, geology, politics, and science. The essays argue points such as humanity's potential for exhausting the supply of non-renewable fuels and what could be done to prevent this.

Contributors
Thomas Homer-Dixon - Introduction and Conclusion
Nick Garrison - Introduction and Conclusion
Ronald Wright - Foreword
David Keith - Dangerous Abundance
David Hughes - The Energy Issue: a More Urgent Problem than Climate Change
Mark Jaccard - Peak Oil and Market Feedbacks: Chicken Little versus Dr. Pangloss
Jeff Rubin - Demand Shift 
William Marsden - The Perfect Moment
Jeffrey Simpson - Broken Hearts, Broken Policies: the Politics of Climate Change

Reception
Quill and Quire stated that the differing outlook of the essays showed that it was "hard to imagine working together on solutions when there is so little consensus about the exact nature of the problems".  Peter Robinson echoed this statement, saying that the book's essays "reinforce the conclusion that it will take all of our ingenuity, will and perseverance to prevent catastrophe." Andrew Nikiforuk praised Carbon Shift, saying that it does "a fine job of exposing Canada's big oily gamble".

References

External links 
Thomas Homer-Dixon's web site
Official publisher's page for Carbon Shift

2009 non-fiction books
2009 anthologies
2009 in the environment
Canadian non-fiction books
Environmental non-fiction books
Books about energy issues
Canadian anthologies
Essay anthologies
Vintage Books books